Melese chiriquensis is a moth of the family Erebidae. It was described by William Schaus in 1905. It is found in Panama.

References

Melese
Moths described in 1905
Arctiinae of South America